Alexandre Casimir Maurice Froyez (15 July 1860 1942) was a French actor, author and journalist, mostly remembered as show organiser and playwright as well as for his friendly bonds with Edmond Rostand.

Theatre and shows 

À qui la pomme ? revue in 3 acts, with Edmond Rostand and Jules Oudot, 1888
Les Coulisses de Paris, revue in 3 acts and 5 tableaux, with Jules Oudot, Émile Duret and Henry de Gorsse, Paris, Nouveautés, 26 January 1891
La Commère apprivoisée, revue in three acts, with Alexandre Michel, Paris, théâtre d'Application, 24 January 1892
Pour un baiser, comédie lyrique in 1 act, Paris, théâtre d'Application, 26 May 1892
La Belle Tunisienne, opera in 1 act, with Gaston Lemaire, Étretat, 26 August 1892
Un baiser en diligence, opéra-comique in one act, Paris, Menus-Plaisirs, 5 December 1893
Y... T..., rue des Dames, comedy in 3 acts, with Louis Artus, Paris, théâtre Déjazet, 10 February 1894
Un voyage à Venise, folie-vaudeville in 3 acts, with G. Lainé, Paris, théâtre Déjazet, 21 February 1896
Une altesse à la mer, fantaisie in 2 acts, with Georges Berr, Paris, Théâtre-Salon, 28 January 1897
Les Mystères de Montmartre, fantaisie d'actualité, with Jean Mongerolles, Paris, théâtre de la Gaîté-Rochechouart, October 1897
La Dame de trèfle, operetta in 3 acts, with Charles Clairville, Paris, Bouffes-Parisiens, 13 May 1898
Le Grand duc Moleskine, fantaisie in 1 act, with Georges Berr, Paris, La Cigale, 11 November 1898
Enfin, seuls ! ou la Chasteté du vicomte, fantaisie-revue in one act, with Jean Mongerolles, Paris, Théâtre de la Bodinière, 20 December 1898
C'est demain la première, fantaisie in 1 act, Paris, La Roulotte, 10 February 1899
Joli Sport, vaudeville in 3 acts, with Paul Dehère, Paris, théâtre Déjazet, 26 April 1899
Plaisir d'amour, comédie-bouffe in 3 acts, with Georges Berr, Paris, Paris, théâtre de Cluny, 10 October 1899
Conte de fée, ballet in 1 act, in verses, Paris, théâtre Sarah Bernhardt, 12 June 1901
La Pucelle de Mexico, fantaisie à grand spectacle, in 2 acts and 8 tableaux, with Henry de Gorsse, Paris, La Cigale, 1 February 1902
Les Marraines du siècle, féerie à grand spectacle, with Henry de Gorsse, Paris, La Cigale, 8 June 1902
Second Ménage, comedy in three acts, with André Sylvane, Paris, Odéon, 27 May 1902
Le Dragon de Pichenette, operetta in 1 act, with Charles Carpentier, Paris, 30 March 1906
Dette de femme, comedy in 1 act, Paris, théâtre des Capucines, 14 February 1907
À quoi tient l'amour ! comedy in 1 act, Paris, Tréteau-Royal, 11 May 1907
Vive la Parisienne, fantaisie-opérette à grand spectacle in 2 acts and 5 tableaux, Paris, Parisiana, 20 January 1907
L'Écrasé, comedy in 1 act, Paris, Olympia, 15 September 1909
Les Yeux qui changent, play in four acts, with Victor Cyril, Paris, théâtre des Arts, 10 April 1910
The Musical Duke, sketch musical in 1 act, with Joseph Coudurier de Chassaigne, London, London Palladium, 10 June 1912
Plantons les capucines, revuette, with Dominique Bonnard and Gina Palerme, London, Ambassadors Theatre, 11 May 1914

References 

19th-century French journalists
French male journalists
19th-century French dramatists and playwrights
Writers from Paris
1860 births
1942 deaths
19th-century French male writers